Specific name may refer to:
 in Database management systems, a system-assigned name that is unique within a particular database

In taxonomy, either of these two meanings, each with its own set of rules:
 Specific name (botany), the two-part (binomial) name of a plant species
 Specific name (zoology), the second part (the species epithet) of the name of an animal species